Oliver Roger Barrett (1873-1950) was a lawyer, author, and prolific collector of Abraham Lincoln artifacts.

Born in 1873, Barrett became interested in collecting autographs, artifacts, and letters from celebrities. He eventually received his law degree from University of Michigan and fought in the Spanish–American War.

Barrett continued his career as a lawyer in Kenilworth, Illinois, and developed an obsession with building his Abraham Lincoln collection. This collection earned him fame among Lincoln scholars and researchers, most notably Carl Sandburg, who also became a client of his law practice. With Sandburg's help, Barrett wrote a book entitled Lincoln's Last Speech in Springfield in the Campaign of 1858 in 1924. Sandburg also wrote a book about Barrett's collection, Lincoln Collector: The Story of the Oliver R. Barrett Lincoln Collection, published 1949.

Oliver R. Barrett died in 1950.

References

External links 
  Oliver Barrett-Carl Sandburg Papers at Newberry Library

1873 births
1950 deaths
University of Michigan Law School alumni
American military personnel of the Spanish–American War
Illinois lawyers
People from Kenilworth, Illinois